Nagma ( – 28 September 2015) was a Bangladeshi film actress. She acted in over 150 films. She was known for acting in negative roles.

Biography
Nagma's real name was Salma Aktar Lina. Her first film was Khuner Bodla which was released in 1994. Later, she appeared in over 150 films.

Nagma died on 28 September 2015 at the age of 40.

Selected filmography
 Khuner Bodla
 Swami Keno Asami
 Meyerao Manush
 Akheri Jobab
 Saheb Name Golam
 Asami Greftar
 Swami Hara Sundori
 Bishe Vora Nagin
 Daini Buri
 Shaktir Lorai
 Chorer Rani

References

1970s births
2015 deaths
Bangladeshi film actresses